The Plymouth Boat Cruises was an excursion boat operator on the River Tamar in South Devon. It was started in 1981, in competition with Millbrook Steamboat & Trading Co Ltd.  In 1985 the Millbrook company withdrew from the Tamar, and several of its vessels were transferred to Plymouth Boat Cruises.  In 2005 the company was taken over by Sound Cruising
.

Fleet List

The 1985 Reshuffle
In 1985 Dart Pleasure Craft - owners of the Millbrook Steamboat & Trading Co Ltd decided to withdraw from the River Tamar, mainly due to competition with Plymouth Boat Cruises.  The Cremyll Ferry was taken over by a new operator: Tamar Cruising / Cremyll Ferry.  Some vessels eventually were sold to G.H. Riddalls and Sons. In the process of all of these changes the fleets of all five companies underwent many changes, which are listed below

Ferries of South West England
Ferry transport in England
Water transport in Devon
River Tamar
Transport in Plymouth, Devon